Lago Nero (Italian for "black lake") is a lake in the Province of Piacenza, Emilia-Romagna, Italy.

Lakes of Emilia-Romagna